The following is a list of notable events and releases of the year 1889 in Norwegian music.

Events

Deaths

 January
 10 – Martin Andreas Udbye, composer and organist (born 1820).

Births

 May
 25 – Sverre Jordan, composer, orchestra conductor, and pianist (died 1972).

See also
 1889 in Norway
 Music of Norway

References

 
Norwegian music
Norwegian
Music
1880s in Norwegian music